is a Japanese footballer who plays for Kyoto Sanga FC.

Club statistics
Updated to 19 February 2019.

References

External links

Profile at Júbilo Iwata

1994 births
Living people
Aoyama Gakuin University alumni
Association football people from Chiba Prefecture
Japanese footballers
J1 League players
J2 League players
Júbilo Iwata players
Kyoto Sanga FC players
Association football midfielders